Prospect Park is a historic neighborhood within the University community of the U.S. city of Minneapolis, Minnesota.  The area is bounded by the Mississippi River to the south, the City of Saint Paul, Minnesota to the east, the Burlington Northern railroad yard to the north, and the Stadium Village commercial district of the University of Minnesota to the west. The neighborhood is composed of several districts which include the East River Road area.  The 1913 Prospect Park Water Tower is a landmark and neighborhood icon.

An urban village once served by streetcar, Prospect Park is now a combination of multiple districts and uses. People live in single-family homes on Tower Hill, as well as apartment housing in the western districts. Estate homes of the early to mid 20th century line East River Road. The SouthEast Industrial Area (SEMI) in the north contains light manufacturing, rail yards and remnant grain silos. University Avenue houses a mix of retail and restaurant businesses from the Stadium Village area.

The entire  core of the neighborhood was listed on the National Register of Historic Places in 2015 as the Prospect Park Residential Historic District for its significance in the theme of social history.  It was nominated for its cohesive community spirit, developed—despite the neighborhood's hilly terrain and diverse housing stock—through such innovations as Minneapolis's first community association.

History
In 1874 real estate tycoon Louis F. Menage began plotting new subdivisions along Minneapolis's southern boundaries. Menage petitioned the City Council to accept his Prospect Park plats in 1884. Construction lasted into the 1910s as topography and geographic isolation made building difficult. Houses were designed in the popular architectural styles of the period, especially the Queen Anne and the Colonial Revival styles. The Minneapolis Board of Education constructed the Sidney Pratt Elementary School in 1898.

Thomas Lowry's interurban commuter train served the neighborhood with its stop at Malcolm Avenue until eventually the intercity line between Saint Paul and Minneapolis along University Avenue was opened. The Franklin Avenue Bridge also eventually carried a line.

Tower Hill

The Tower, designed by Frederick William Cappelen, is listed on the National Register of Historic Places.

Demographics
The neighborhood is demographically diverse. Tower Hill extending south to the river contains families and retired empty-nesters. The Glendale Housing project southeast of 27th Avenue SE and University Avenue SE contains 700 families with the average household income slightly above $9,000 and 32% of residents living at or below the poverty level.  On the former industrial areas of the west and north are newer student housing apartment buildings for both undergraduate and graduate students.

Race
 White 52.4%
 Black 11.0%
 American Indian and Alaska Native 0.3%
 Asian 27.0%
 Other 0.4%
 Two or more 4.6%

Ethnicity
 Not hispanic or Latino 96.6%
 Hispanic or Latino 4.4%

Government
Prospect Park is entirely within Minneapolis's Ward 2, currently represented by Cam Gordon on the Minneapolis City Council.  The neighborhood association, PPERRIA, founded in 1901, is the oldest neighborhood association in the city of Minneapolis.

Arts and culture
The neighborhood has an annual "Ice Cream Social," a get-together for the neighborhood with food, music and other entertainment. It is the one time of year when the interior of the Prospect Park Water Tower is opened to the public, allowing for a panoramic view of Minneapolis from the top.

Near the south end of the neighborhood on Bedford Street is the Malcolm Willey House, designed by Frank Lloyd Wright and named after a University administrator. The historic significance of the house played a large part in preventing its destruction when Interstate 94 was built in the 1950s. The current goal of the neighborhood is to establish an "urban-village" feel — that is, a somewhat self-contained feel in the context of a larger city. Prospect Park also has a few surviving houses from the 19th century.

The neighborhood is home to two community centers, Pratt Elementary School and Luxton Park.

Gallery

See also
National Register of Historic Places listings in Hennepin County, Minnesota
Neighborhoods of Minneapolis
University community of Minneapolis

References

External links 
 
Prospect Park East River Road neighborhood of Minneapolis
The Bridge newspaper

Neighborhoods in Minneapolis
Historic districts on the National Register of Historic Places in Minnesota
National Register of Historic Places in Minneapolis